The 2011–12 EHF Champions League was the 52nd edition of Europe's premier club handball tournament and the nineteenth edition under the current EHF Champions League format. FC Barcelona were the defending champions. The final four was played on 26–27 May 2012. For the third consecutive year it will be played at the Lanxess Arena in Cologne.

THW Kiel won the title for the third time after defeating Atlético Madrid 26–21 in the final.

Overview

Team allocation

th Title Holder

Round and draw dates

Qualification stage

Qualification tournament 
A total of 12 teams took part in the qualification tournaments. The clubs were drawn into three groups of four and played a semifinal and the final. The winner of the qualification groups advanced to the group stage, while the eliminated clubs went to the EHF Cup. Matches were played at 3–4 September 2011.

Seedings

Group 1 
The tournament was organised by the Slovakian club HT Tatran Prešov.

Bracket

Semifinals

Third place game

Final

Group 2 
The tournament was organised by the Austrian club Aon Fivers Margareten.

Bracket

Semifinals

Third place game

Final

Group 3 
The tournament was organised by the Israeli club Maccabi Rishon LeZion.

Bracket

Semifinals

Third place game

Final

Wild card tournament 
Initially five teams applied for the four tournament places and following the decision of the European Handball Federation the request from the Danish Handball Association for Skjern Handbold was rejected. The clubs were drawn together automatically according to their league coefficient and decided the winner of the tournament using a final four system. Only the victorious team advanced to the Champions League group stage, while the losing sides continued their European adventure in the EHF Cup. The tournament was held at 3–4 September 2011, and was organized by Vive Targi Kielce.

Bracket

Semifinals

Third place game

Final

Group stage 

The draw for the group stage took place at the Gartenhotel Altmannsdorf in Vienna on 28 June 2011 at 11:00 local time. A total of 24 teams were drawn into four groups of six. Teams were divided into six pots, based on EHF coefficients. Clubs from the same pot or the same association could not be drawn into the same group, except the wild card tournament winner, which did not enjoy any protection.

Seedings

Group A

Group B

Group C

Group D

Knockout stage

Last 16

Seedings

Matches
The draw was held on 28 February 2012 at 11:00 in Hørsholm, Denmark. The first legs will be played on 14–18 March, and the second legs will be played on 21–25 March 2012.

Quarterfinals

Seedings
The draw was held on 27 March 2012 at 11:30 local time in Vienna. The first legs were played on 18–22 April, and the second legs were played on 25–29 April 2012.

Matches

Final four
The semifinals was played on 26 May 2012. The third place game and the final was played on 27 May 2012 in the Lanxess Arena at Cologne, Germany. The draw was held on May 2, 2012 in Cologne.

Top scorers 

Final statistics

References

External links 
 EHF Champions League website

 
Champions League
Champions League
EHF Champions League seasons